Dreams in Prussian Blue is a fiction novel written by Paritosh Uttam. The book has been adapted into an award winning Malayalam drama film titled Artist (2013) written and directed by Shyamaprasad.

References 

Novels set in Mumbai
2010 Indian novels
2010 debut novels